Yasser Mohammed Hefny (born 8 February 1989) is an Egyptian modern pentathlete.  Hefny has won many international competitions including the youth world championship of pentathlon in 2005 and 2007, and later the world champion of speedball in Paris.

Early life
His love of sports began when he started swimming in the school of el Zohoor club, and at the age of 6 he joined the speedball school in the same club. After two years, Yasser decided to go competitive and joined the boys swimming and speedball teams.

At the age of 11, Hefny have decided to find a new competition to challenge himself so he joined the modern pentathlon team in 6 October club. At the age of 12, he was chosen to join the Egyptian national team of modern pentathlon and began his international achievements by winning his first international title in the biathlon world championship in 2004 in Germany.

Recent accomplishments
Hefny won many international championships, including the world championships in 2005 and 2007 at the age of 16 and 18.  He also became the 2008 world champion of speedball in Paris, France, setting a new record of 570.

In 2012, he competed at the 2012 Summer Olympics.

References 

1989 births
Living people
Egyptian male modern pentathletes
Olympic modern pentathletes of Egypt
Modern pentathletes at the 2012 Summer Olympics